For the Summer Olympics, there have been fourteen Olympic sports that have been discontinued from the program as of the 2012 Summer Olympics in London. For the 2016 Summer Olympics in Rio de Janeiro, golf and rugby union were reinstated as Olympic sports (though the latter was as rugby sevens). As of 2011, there have been eight baseball, two basque pelota, one cricket, one croquet, two golf, one jeu de paume, two lacrosse, five polo, one racquets, five rugby union (fifteen-a-side), four softball, five tug of war, and one water motorsports venues used for the Summer Olympics.

Baseball and softball, now governed by a single international federation and thus treated by the International Olympic Committee (IOC) as two disciplines of a single sport, will be part of the 2020 Summer Olympics program in Tokyo. The sports are not included in Paris' plan for the 2024 Games, but are part of Los Angeles' plan for the 2028 Games.

Basque pelota

Cricket

Croquet

Jeu de paume

Lacrosse

Polo

Racquets

Roque

Rugby union (fifteen-a-side)

Tug of war

Water motorsports

References

Disc